McDonnell v. United States, 579 U.S. ___ (2016), was a United States Supreme Court case concerning the appeal of former Virginia Governor Robert F. McDonnell's conviction under the Hobbs Act.  At issue on appeal was whether the definition of "official act" within the federal bribery statutes encompassed the actions for which McDonnell had been convicted and whether the jury had been properly instructed on this definition at trial.

In light of the court's findings, US District Judge T. S. Ellis III of Virginia ruled on an appeal and dropped seven of ten charges for which former Representative William J. Jefferson of New Orleans was convicted in 2012. He ordered him released from prison on October 5, 2017, pending a new sentence or action from the government.

Case background
Anatabloc is a tobacco extract which the company Star Scientific was producing in Virginia. Virginia has been a tobacco-producing state. The governor held events promoting the company's product at his governor's mansion after receiving kickbacks from the company.

McDonnell's case was prosecuted as a federal case even though he was a state governor under the Guarantee Clause of Article IV because state corruption at the governor's level affects the federal union of the states. In addition, there was a conflict of interest at the state level because Ken Cuccinelli, the Attorney General of Virginia at the time, was a prominent ally of the governor.

At the trial in the United States District Court for the Eastern District of Virginia, prosecutors charged Robert F. McDonnell and his wife with quid pro quo. The jury found the McDonnells guilty of multiple counts of corruption. James R. Spencer presided over the initial trial.

United States Court of Appeals for the Fourth Circuit unanimously affirmed the convictions of the McDonnells.

Opinion of the Court 
Chief Justice John Roberts authored the unanimous opinion. McDonnell's conviction was vacated on the grounds that the meaning of "official act" does not include merely setting up a meeting, calling another public official, or hosting an event.

Impact

Narrowed Definition about Bribery

The ruling narrowed the legal definition of public corruption and made it harder for prosecutors to prove that a political official engaged in bribery.

According to Bloomberg News, the ruling "appears to have opened the floodgates for reversals of high-profile public corruption cases, including William Jefferson, a former Louisiana congressman. Former New York State Assembly Speaker Sheldon Silver; Dean Skelos, a former majority leader of the New York state senate; and Skelos’s son, Adam Skelos, have since had corruption convictions overturned on similar grounds."

Legal Citations

The ruling in the Supreme Court case was cited by United States District Court for the District of New Jersey for dismissing another federal case against United States Senator Bob Menendez of New Jersey. The case against Menendez was eventually dismissed.

In the aftermath of the Kids for cash scandal, former President Judge Mark Ciavarella of the Luzerne County Court of Common Pleas has also cited the Supreme Court ruling in an attempt to overturn his own twenty-eight year sentence in federal prison. The basis for citing the ruling is that it altered the definition of an official act for the crime of bribery. Judge Thomas L. Ambro of the U.S. Court of Appeals for the Third Circuit rejected Ciavarella's appeal. In his opinion, Judge Ambro stated that "Ciavarella’s bribery-related actions still satisfy even a post-McDonnell understanding of ‘official act.’ If sentencing hundreds of juvenile offenders to excessive terms of incarceration is not an ‘official act,’ then nothing is.”

See also 

 Honest services fraud
 Skilling v. United States

References

Further reading

External links
 
 SCOTUSblog coverage

United States Supreme Court cases
United States Supreme Court cases of the Roberts Court
United States Sixth Amendment jury case law
2019 in United States case law
Honest services fraud case law
Void for vagueness case law
Political scandals in Virginia
Governor of Virginia